Joan may refer to:

People and fictional characters
Joan (given name), including a list of women, men and fictional characters
Joan of Arc, a French military heroine
Joan (surname)

Weather events
Tropical Storm Joan (disambiguation), multiple tropical cyclones are named Joan

Music
Joan (album), a 1967 album by Joan Baez
"Joan", a song by The Art Bears from their 1978 album Hopes and Fears
"Joan", a song by Lene Lovich from her 1980 album Flex
"Joan", a song by Erasure from their 1991 album Chorus
"Joan", a song by The Innocence Mission from their 1991 album Umbrella
"Joan", a song by God Is My Co-Pilot from their 1992 album I Am Not This Body

Other uses
Jōan (era), a Japanese era name
Joan (play), 2015 one-woman play written by Lucy J. Skillbeck
Joan Township, Ontario, a geographic township

See also

Jo-an tea house, National Treasure in Inuyama, Aichi Prefecture, Japan
 
Jane (disambiguation)
Jean (disambiguation)
Jeanne (disambiguation)
Jehanne (disambiguation)
John (disambiguation)
Joanne (disambiguation)
Joanna
Johanna